Morning Song is an album by David Murray released on the Italian Black Saint label in 1983. It features performances by Murray, John Hicks, Reggie Workman and Ed Blackwell.

Reception
The Rolling Stone Jazz Record Guide  called it' "an inspired mixture of originals and standards", giving it five stars.
The Allmusic review by Scott Yanow awarded the album 4 stars, stating: "For David Murray, this is a fairly straightforward quartet date. Joined by pianist John Hicks, bassist Reggie Workman and drummer Ed Blackwell, Murray performs three of his lesser-known originals, Butch Morris' 'Light Blue Frolic,' 'Body and Soul' and 'Jitterbug Waltz.' Doubling on tenor and bass clarinet, Murray as usual has a tendency to jump into the extreme upper register a bit too much at unexpected times, disrupting a relatively mellow mood on a few occasions. But one cannot deny his musicianship, and there are some exciting moments to be heard during this program."

Track listing 
 "Morning Song" – 8:05  
 "Body and Soul" (Eyton, Green, Heyman, Sour) – 6:50  
 "Light Blue Frolic" (Morris) – 7:27  
 "Jitterbug Waltz" (Maltby, Waller) – 6:26  
 "The Off Season" – 10:56  
 "Duet" – 2:14  
 
All compositions by David Murray except as indicated
 Recorded at Vanguard Studios, NYC, September 25, 26 & 30,1983

Personnel 
 David Murray – tenor saxophone, bass clarinet
 John Hicks – piano
 Reggie Workman – bass
 Ed Blackwell – drums

References 

1983 albums
David Murray (saxophonist) albums
Black Saint/Soul Note albums